Fighting Spirit may refer to:

 Fighting Spirit (manga) (Hajime no Ippo) a boxing anime and manga series
 Victorious Boxers 2, subtitled Fighting Spirit, a boxing video game for the PlayStation 2 based on the anime/manga series
 "Fighting Spirit" (Power Rangers), the 27th episode of the American children's television series Power Rangers: Dino Thunder
 Fighting Spirit Magazine, a monthly professional wrestling and mixed martial arts magazine 
 "Fighting Spirit", a bonus track on the 2005 Madonna album Confessions on a Dancefloor